Reginald S. Porter Jr. (born July 13, 1994) is a former American football cornerback. He played college football at Utah.

Early years
Porter attended Amite High School in Amite, Louisiana, he won three district championships during his tenure there. He also lettered in football and track.

College career
Porter played in 36 games for the Utah Utes. Porter finished his college career with 2 interceptions and 43 total tackles.

Professional career

Indianapolis Colts
After going undrafted in the 2017 NFL Draft, Porter signed with the Indianapolis Colts as an undrafted free agent on May 4, 2017. He was waived on June 12, 2017.

Baltimore Ravens
Porter was signed by the Baltimore Ravens on July 21, 2017. He was waived on September 2, 2017 and signed to the practice squad the next day.

Cleveland Browns
The Cleveland Browns signed Porter off the Ravens' practice squad on September 20, 2017. He was placed on injured reserve on November 8, 2017 with an Achilles injury. He was waived by the Browns on April 20, 2018 with a failed physical.

References

External links
Utah Utes bio
Cleveland Browns bio

1994 births
Living people
Players of American football from Louisiana
People from Amite City, Louisiana
American football cornerbacks
Utah Utes football players
Indianapolis Colts players
Baltimore Ravens players
Cleveland Browns players
African-American players of American football
21st-century African-American sportspeople